Kenny Thomson (born 9 November 1951) is a Scottish former footballer, who played for Dunfermline, Alloa Athletic, St Johnstone and Cowdenbeath. He achieved one of the highest total of Scottish league appearances: 654, between 1970 and 1992.

Playing career
Thomson started playing at Townhill Boys Club 
Thomson made his Dunfermline debut in August 1970 and despite being part of the team relegating from the first division in 1971-72 he played a part in Dunfermline coming straight back up in 1972-73. After the league restructuring and another relegation Thomson played a key role in the club's promotion in 1979 and was presented with the Dunfermline Player of the Year award. However, he was freed by new manager Pat Stanton in 1982.

Thomson joined Alloa Athletic where he helped them achieve promotion in 1984-85 and later St Johnstone who were promoted to the Premier Division in 1990.

See also
 List of footballers in Scotland by number of league appearances (500+)

References

External links
 

1951 births
Scottish footballers
Scottish Football League players
Living people
Dunfermline Athletic F.C. players
Alloa Athletic F.C. players
St Johnstone F.C. players
Cowdenbeath F.C. players
Footballers from Dunfermline
Association football defenders